Aloysius Pieris SJ (born 9 April 1934) is a Sri Lankan Jesuit priest, theologian, intellect, and the founding director of the Tulana Research Center for Encounter and Dialogue.

Biography 
Aloysius Pieris was born in Ampitiya, Ceylon (present-day Sri Lanka). He was a brilliant student during his days at the prestigious, St. Aloysius' College, Galle. After responding to his call to be a priest of God, the young Aloysius took his Jesuit vows in 1953. Pieris has three theological degrees, an LPh from Sacred Heart College in Shembaganur, India (1959), STL from the Pontifical Theological Faculty in Naples (1966), and a Th.D. from Tilburg University (1987). Pieris also has a BA in Pali and Sanskrit from the University of London (1961) and a Ph.D. in Buddhist philosophy from the University of Sri Lanka (1971). He has held academic posts as Franciscan Chair in Mission Studies at Washington Theological Union, Henry Luce Chair of World Christianity at Union Theological Seminary, New York, and A. P. Wilson Distinguished Visiting Chair of Theology at Vanderbilt Divinity School.

In June 1974, Pieris established the Tulana Research Center for Encounter and Dialogue in Kelaniya, Sri Lanka, and has been its director ever since. Tulana was created as a Jesuit retreat site, but also as a space for Buddhist-Christian interfaith dialogue.

One of Pieris's most well-known writings, An Asian Theology of Liberation (1988), attempts to move beyond the limitations of Latin American liberation theology and engage an Asia that is wreaked by severe poverty and shaped by deep religiosity.

Honors 
A festschrift was prepared in his honor on the occasion of his seventieth birthday, entitled Encounters with the Word (2004).

In November 2015, Pieris was awarded an honorary DLitt in recognition of his lifetime contribution to field of humanities by the University of Kelaniya.

In January 2019, Pieris was awarded the International Harmony Theologian Prize by the Institute of International Harmony and Sustainable Development, Bishop Dennis Ng Victory Ministries Foundation at the International Harmony Conference on 7 January 2019.

Works

References

External links 

 Tulana Research Center for Encounter and Dialogue

 
1934 births
Living people
Sri Lankan Jesuits
Anti-poverty advocates
Religious studies scholars
Liberation theologians
World Christianity scholars
20th-century Roman Catholic theologians
21st-century Roman Catholic theologians